Buryatia is a part of the Russian Federation. One of the country's main instruments is a two-stringed horse-head fiddle called a morin khuur.  This is an instrument closely linked to the all-important cult of the horse, belonging to the intangible heritage of all Mongolic peoples. Other elements of Buryat music, such as the use of fourths both in tuning instruments and in songs, and pentatonic scales, reveal similarities to music from Siberia and Eastern Asia.  There traditionally was no polyphony, instead voices and instruments performed the same melody in unison but varied in timing and ornamentation.

Narrative structures are a part of most Buryat folk music, often in the form of epic tales, and the last song of famous leaders; these include the Last Song of Rinchin Dorzhin.

Under Soviet control, Buryat folk music was sanitized and mostly allowed in forms that were supportive of the state's power. This period saw state-approved songs recollecting events such as the Civil War and the Great Patriotic War.

The first Buryat rock band was Uragsha, who were one of the few bands of the time to sing both in Russian and their native Mongolian language. Their collaborations with La MaMa theater in New York City in late 1990s led to their embrace of traditional music and shamanic roots too, and eventually to formation of the group Namgar that represents Buryat traditional music at world music festivals since 2001.

Vladlen Pantaev is also a notable Buryat musician; one of the key composers of Buryat folk music. He has devoted many years to the National Theater in Ulan-Ude. Many of his songs are widely recognized in the region.

See also
Anatoliy Andreyev – Buryat composer of popular and classical music
Namgar is a band performing traditional Buryat and Mongolian music
Buryat National Opera

Further reading 
 Anthology of Buryat folklore, Pushkinskiĭ dom, 2000 (CD)

References

Buryat music